is the debut indie single by Japanese girl idol group Juice=Juice, released in Japan on April 3, 2013.

The physical CD single ranked 25th place in the Japanese Oricon weekly singles chart.

Track listing

Charts

References

External links 
 Profile of the CD single  on the official website of Hello! Project
 Profile of the CD single  on the official website of Up-Front Works

2013 singles
Japanese-language songs
Juice=Juice songs
Songs written by Tsunku
Song recordings produced by Tsunku
2013 songs
Japanese synth-pop songs